Robert Jacob Alexander, Baron Skidelsky,  (born 25 April 1939) is a British economic historian. He is the author of a three-volume award-winning biography of British economist John Maynard Keynes (1883–1946). Skidelsky read history at Jesus College, Oxford, and is Emeritus Professor of Political Economy at the University of Warwick, England.

Early life 
Skidelsky's parents, Boris Skidelsky and Galia Sapelkin, were British subjects of Russian ancestry, Jewish on his father's side and Christian on his mother's. His father worked for the family firm L. S. Skidelsky which leased the Mulin coalmine from the Chinese government. Boris had three brothers, one of whom was the British novelist and bridge player and writer S. J. "Skid" Simon (1904–1948). In 1919, a factory was built by L. S. Skidelsky in Harbin for obtaining albumin from blood.

When war broke out between Britain and Japan in December 1941, he and his parents were interned first in Manchuria then Japan and finally released in exchange for Japanese internees in England. He then went back to China with his parents in 1947, living for a little over a year in Tientsin (now Tianjin). They left for Hong Kong just before the Chinese Communists took the city.

Education 
From 1953 to 1958, Skidelsky was a boarder at Brighton College. He went on to read history at Jesus College, Oxford. Between 1961 and 1969 he was successively research student, senior student and research fellow at Nuffield College, Oxford. In 1967 he published his first book, Politicians and the Slump, based on his DPhil dissertation, which explores the ways in which British politicians handled the Great Depression.

Academic career 
During a two-year research fellowship at the British Academy Skidelsky published English Progressive Schools (1969) and began work on his biography of Oswald Mosley, which was published in 1975. In 1970, he became an associate professor of history in the School of Advanced International Studies at Johns Hopkins University. However, the controversy surrounding the publication of his biography of Mosley, which some critics felt let Mosley off too lightly, led Johns Hopkins to refuse him tenure. Oxford also proved unwilling to give him a permanent post.

From 1976 to 1978, Skidelsky was Professor of History, Philosophy and European Studies at the Polytechnic of North London. In 1978, he was appointed Professor of International Studies at the University of Warwick, where he has since remained, although he joined the Economics Department as Professor of Political Economy in 1990. He has been a professorial fellow at the Global Policy Institute at London Metropolitan University, and a Honorary Fellow of Jesus College, Oxford. He was elected a Fellow of the British Academy in 1994. Since 2016 he has been a director and trustee of the School of Civic Education. He is Emeritus Professor of Political Economy at the University of Warwick.

Skidelsky currently writes a column on economic history for Project Syndicate, an international media organization.

Political career 
Skidelsky has been a member of four political parties. Initially a member of the Labour Party, he left to become a founding member of the Social Democratic Party (SDP), in which he remained until it merged with the Liberal Party to become the Liberal Democrats in 1988. He objected to the merger and remained in the 'continuing' SDP until its dissolution in 1990. On 15 July 1991 he was created a life peer as Baron Skidelsky of Tilton in the County of East Sussex and in 1992 he joined the Conservative Party.  Around the time of the announcement of his peerage it was speculated that David Owen, a co-founder of the SDP, had lobbied then Prime Minister John Major for Skidelsky's appointment.  He was made an opposition spokesman in the Lords, first for Culture, then on the Treasury (1997–1999), but he was removed by William Hague, then party leader, for publicly opposing NATO's bombing of Yugoslavia in 1999.

In 2001 Skidelsky left the Conservative Party for the cross benches. He was Chairman of the Social Market Foundation between 1991 and 2001.

In September 2015 Skidelsky endorsed Jeremy Corbyn's campaign in the Labour Party leadership election, writing in The Guardian: "Corbyn should be praised, not castigated, for bringing to public attention these serious issues concerning the role of the state and the best ways to finance its activities. The fact that he is dismissed for doing so illustrates the dangerous complacency of today's political elites. Millions in Europe rightly feel that the current economic order fails to serve their interests. What will they do if their protests are simply ignored?"

Russia 
In March 2014, it was reported that Skidelsky was a director on the board of the Russian state-owned company Rusnano Capital. After Russia annexed Crimea in 2014, Skidelsky declined to resign from Rusnano, criticised sanctions that targeted Russia and argued that the Russian-speaking parts of Ukraine should be given an opportunity to separate from Ukraine.

Between 2016 and 1 January 2022, Skidelsky was a non-executive director on the board of Russian oil company Russneft.

On 28 February 2022, he signed a letter to the Financial Times on the subject of Ukraine, along with David Owen and others, that stated: "NATO governments have rightly said they are willing to address Russia's security concerns, but then say in the same breath that Russia has no legitimate security concerns because NATO is a purely defensive alliance. Whether we like it or not, a NATO that now borders Russia and could in future border even more of Russia is seen by Russia as a security concern."

On 17 April 2022, he argued against Finland's joining NATO and shortly after against the imposition of economic sanctions on Russia following the invasion of Ukraine.

Awards 
 
The second volume of Skidelsky's three-volume biography of John Maynard Keynes The Economist as Saviour, 1920–1937 won the Wolfson History Prize in 1992. The third volume Fighting for Britain, 1937–1946 won the Duff Cooper Prize in 2000, the James Tait Black Memorial Prize for biography in 2001, the Arthur Ross Book Award for international relations in 2002 and the Lionel Gelber Prize for International Relations and was shortlisted for the Samuel Johnson Prize for non-fiction writing in 2001.

Personal life 
Skidelsky has two sons, Edward Skidelsky, a lecturer in philosophy at the University of Exeter; and William Skidelsky, a journalist and author of Federer and Me: A Story of Obsession.

Selected works 
 1967: Politicians and the Slump
 1969: English Progressive Schools
 1975: Oswald Mosley
 1983: John Maynard Keynes: Hopes Betrayed, 1883–1920
 1992: John Maynard Keynes: The Economist as Saviour, 1920–1937
 1993: Interests and Obsessions: Historical Essays (Macmillan)
 1995: The World After Communism: A Polemic for Our Times (Macmillan)
 Published in America as The Road from Serfdom: The Economic and Political Consequences of the End of Communism
 1996: Keynes (Oxford University Press: Past Masters)
 2000: John Maynard Keynes: Fighting for Freedom, 1937–1946
 2009: Keynes: The Return of the Master (London: Allen Lane)
 2012: How Much Is Enough? Money and the Good Life. with Edward Skidelsky (Allen Lane)
 2018: Money and Government: The Past and Future of Economics
 2020: What’s Wrong with Economics?: A Primer for the Perplexed
 2022: Economic Sanctions: A Weapon out of Control?

References

External links 

 
 Lord Skidelsky: Registered Interests at parliament.uk
 Robert Skidelsky's Interview in the New Statesman about Keynes: the Return of the Master.
 How Much is Enough?: Money and the Good Life Free Webinar with Professor Skidelsky, 20 November 2012
 
 

1939 births
Living people
British people of Russian-Jewish descent
People educated at Brighton College
Academics of the University of Warwick
British biographers
British people of Russian descent
Social Democratic Party (UK) politicians
Conservative Party (UK) life peers
Crossbench life peers
Alumni of Jesus College, Oxford
Fellows of Jesus College, Oxford
Johns Hopkins University faculty
Fellows of Nuffield College, Oxford
Fellows of the British Academy
Fellows of the Royal Society of Literature
James Tait Black Memorial Prize recipients
Life peers created by Elizabeth II